BRCA2 and BRCA2 are a human gene and its protein product, respectively. The official symbol (BRCA2, italic for the gene, nonitalic for the protein) and the official name (originally breast cancer 2; currently BRCA2, DNA repair associated) are maintained by the HUGO Gene Nomenclature Committee. One alternative symbol, FANCD1, recognizes its association with the FANC protein complex. Orthologs, styled Brca2 and Brca2, are common in other vertebrate species. BRCA2 is a human tumor suppressor gene (specifically, a caretaker gene), found in all humans; its protein, also called by the synonym breast cancer type 2 susceptibility protein, is responsible for repairing DNA.

BRCA2 and BRCA1 are normally expressed in the cells of breast and other tissue, where they help repair damaged DNA or destroy cells if DNA cannot be repaired. They are involved in the repair of chromosomal damage with an important role in the error-free repair of DNA double strand breaks. If BRCA1 or BRCA2 itself is damaged by a BRCA mutation, damaged DNA is not repaired properly, and this increases the risk for breast cancer. BRCA1 and BRCA2 have been described as "breast cancer susceptibility genes" and "breast cancer susceptibility proteins".  The predominant allele has a normal tumor suppressive function whereas high penetrance mutations in these genes cause a loss of tumor suppressive function, which correlates with an increased risk of breast cancer.

The BRCA2 gene is located on the long (q) arm of chromosome 13 at position 12.3 (13q12.3). The human reference BRCA2 gene contains 27 exons, and the cDNA has  10,254 base pairs coding for a protein of 3418 amino acids.

Function 

Although the structures of the BRCA1 and BRCA2 genes are very different, at least some functions are interrelated. The proteins made by both genes are essential for repairing damaged DNA (see Figure of recombinational repair steps). BRCA2 binds the single strand DNA and directly interacts with the recombinase RAD51 to stimulate and maintain  strand invasion, a vital step of homologous recombination. The localization of RAD51 to the DNA double-strand break requires the formation of the BRCA1-PALB2-BRCA2 complex. PALB2 (Partner and localizer of BRCA2) can function synergistically with a BRCA2 chimera (termed piccolo, or piBRCA2) to further promote strand invasion. These breaks can be caused by natural and medical radiation or other environmental exposures, but also occur when chromosomes exchange genetic material during a special type of cell division that creates sperm and eggs (meiosis). Double strand breaks are also generated during repair of DNA cross links. By repairing DNA, these proteins play a role in maintaining the stability of the human genome and prevent dangerous gene rearrangements that can lead to hematologic and other cancers.

BRCA2 has been shown to possess a crucial role in protection from the MRE11-dependent nucleolytic degradation of the reversed forks that are forming during DNA replication fork stalling (caused by obstacles such as mutations, intercalating agents etc.).

Like BRCA1, BRCA2 probably regulates the activity of other genes and plays a critical role in embryo development.

Clinical significance 

Certain variations of the BRCA2 gene increase risks for breast cancer as part of a hereditary breast–ovarian cancer syndrome. Researchers have identified hundreds of mutations in the BRCA2 gene, many of which cause an increased risk of cancer. BRCA2 mutations are usually insertions or deletions of a small number of DNA base pairs in the gene. As a result of these mutations, the protein product of the BRCA2 gene is abnormal, and does not function properly. Researchers believe that the defective BRCA2 protein is unable to fix DNA damage that occurs throughout the genome.  As a result, there is an increase in mutations due to error-prone translesion synthesis past un-repaired DNA damage, and some of these mutations can cause cells to divide in an uncontrolled way and form a tumor.

People who have two mutated copies of the BRCA2 gene have one type of Fanconi anemia. This condition is caused by extremely reduced levels of the BRCA2 protein in cells, which allows the accumulation of damaged DNA. Patients with Fanconi anemia are prone to several types of leukemia (a type of blood cell cancer); solid tumors, particularly of the head, neck, skin, and reproductive organs; and bone marrow suppression (reduced blood cell production that leads to anemia).  Women having inherited a defective BRCA1 or BRCA2 gene have risks for breast and ovarian cancer that are so high and seem so selective that many mutation carriers choose to have prophylactic surgery. There has been much conjecture to explain such apparently striking tissue specificity. Major determinants of where BRCA1- and BRCA2-associated hereditary cancers occur are related to tissue specificity of the cancer pathogen, the agent that causes chronic inflammation, or the carcinogen. The target tissue may have receptors for the pathogen, become selectively exposed to carcinogens and an infectious process. An innate genomic deficit impairs normal responses and exacerbates the susceptibility to disease in organ targets. This theory also fits data for several tumor suppressors beyond BRCA1 or BRCA2. A major advantage of this model is that it suggests there are some options in addition to prophylactic surgery.

In addition to breast cancer in men and women, mutations in BRCA2 also lead to an increased risk of ovarian, uterine tube, prostate and pancreatic cancer. In some studies, mutations in the central part of the gene have been associated with a higher risk of ovarian cancer and a lower risk of prostate cancer than mutations in other parts of the gene. Several other types of cancer have also been seen in certain families with BRCA2 mutations.

In general, strongly inherited gene mutations (including mutations in BRCA2) account for only 5-10% of breast cancer cases; the specific risk of getting breast or other cancer for anyone carrying a BRCA2 mutation depends on many factors.

History